A list of American feature films released in 1934.
 
It Happened One Night won Best Picture at the 7th Academy Awards on February 27, 1935.

A-B

C-D

E-F

G-H

I-J

K-L

M-N

O-P

Q-R

S-T

U-Z

See also
 1934 in the United States

References

External links

1934 films at the Internet Movie Database

1934
Films
Lists of 1934 films by country or language